YTC may refer to:

Yeshiva Toras Chaim
Yakima Training Center
Yunnan Tin Group (Holding) Company Limited
Yellowhead Tribal Council, whose education program YTC Education became Yellowhead Tribal College
Youth Travel Circle, Malta
Yield to call, a variant of yield to maturity